Fenestratarum is a genus of flowering plants in the arum family Araceae, native to Borneo. There are only two known species, which are found on different soil types (sandstone and basalt) and 600km apart, furthermore each is restricted to one local population.

Species
Currently accepted species include:

Fenestratarum culum P.C.Boyce & S.Y.Wong
Fenestratarum mulayadii P.C.Boyce & S.Y.Wong

References

Aroideae
Araceae genera
Endemic flora of Borneo